Maciej Zień (Maciej Zień; born 24 April 1979 in Lublin, Poland) is a Polish fashion designer.

Biography
Zień’s career started when as a teenager he presented his collection Provocations in Lublin. He admits that he had a lot of luck. “But what counts most is stubbornness...putting your heart into what you’re doing.”

Maciej Zień has made a brilliant career—his clothes were worn by former First Lady of Poland Jolanta Kwaśniewska, soprano Ewa Małas-Godlewska, Polish pop singer Kayah and businesswoman Anna Starak. “Fashion has always been my great passion,” says Zień. “I decided what I wanted to do in life when I opened my atelier. It was created with single, expensive creations in mind, but it started to develop after a while.” Zień is also preparing a less expensive pret-a-porter collection and gradually creating a network of boutiques. Garments with a Mat Alex or Maciej Zień label can be bought in London and Geneva, and will soon appear in Monte Carlo.

Zień is the only Polish designer whose work has been shown at the National Museum. “My biggest success was working with Patricia Kaas. I went to her concert in Riga; we started to talk and this is how it all started.” Zień has also designed a VIP room for the club Utopia, and costumes for a play. His passion is designing interiors and accessories.

References
Info
 

Polish fashion designers
1979 births
Living people
Polish LGBT people
LGBT fashion designers